Biancaea decapetala, commonly known as shoofly, Mauritius or Mysore thorn or the cat's claw, is a tropical tree species originating in India.

Introduced range
B. decapetala has been introduced to Fiji, French Polynesia, Hawai‘i, New Caledonia, Norfolk Island, Australia, China, Japan, Korea, Indonesia, Malaysia, Philippines, Thailand, Vietnam, Mauritius, Réunion, Rodrigues, Kenya and South Africa. It has become a seriously problematic invasive species in many locations.

Description

Habit and reproduction
In Hawai‘i, where B. decapetala  has the local name pōpoki, it forms impenetrable brambles, climbs high up trees, closes off pastures to animals and impedes forest pathways. Trailing branches root where they touch the ground. The medium-sized seeds may be dispersed by rodents and granivorous birds and running water.

References

 Invasive Species Specialist Group (ISSG). Biancaea decapetala

External links
 EOL
 

Caesalpinieae
Flora of tropical Asia
Flora of temperate Asia